The name Divina may refer to:

Given name
 Divina de Campo, English drag queen, singer, and actor
 Divina D'Anna (born 1976), Australian politician
 Divina Estrella (born 1956), Dominican Republic sprinter
 Divina Frau-Meigs (born 1959), Moroccan sociologist and professor
 Divina Galica (born 1944), British sportswoman
 Divina Grace Yu, Filipino politician
 Divina Maloum, activist from Cameroon

Surname
 Mascarita Divina (born 1990),  ring name of a Mexican Luchador enmascarado
 Nilo Divina (born 1965), Filipino lawyer, professor, author, and educational administrator

Nickname
 La Divina, a nickname for Marie Callas (1923–1977), Greek operatic soprano

Characters
 The lead character in Divina, está en tu corazón, a Spanish-language telenovela